Kelvin Han Yee (born June 14, 1961, San Francisco, California) is an American actor who has appeared in numerous films such as Destroyer, Milk (as Gordon Lau), Bucky Larson: Born to Be a Star (as Vietnamese Crime Boss), Lucky You (as Chico Banh), The Island (as a Censor), So I Married an Axe Murderer (as Master Cho), Answers to Nothing (as an EMT), Sweet November (as Burly Man), Patch Adams, Life Tastes Good (as Max), Clint Eastwood's True Crime (as Zachary Platt), A Great Wall (as Paul Fang, the film was also the first American Feature Film to be shot in the People's Republic of China by MGM).

He has been seen on television in 9-1-1, GLOW, Scorpion, Westworld, Gone, Chicago P.D., Hawaii Five-0, Criminal Minds, Eastwick, Crash, Lie to Me, Prison Break, Entourage, The Mentalist, Chuck, Curb Your Enthusiasm, The Young and the Restless, Accidentally on Purpose, 24, Sucker Free City, Days of Our Lives, The Bold and the Beautiful, E-Ring (as Admiral Chin), Hawaii, and Nash Bridges.

Yee is a San Francisco native who, as a teenager, became involved with the pioneering work of the Asian American Theater Company. He was an original members of The National Theater Of The Deranged and the San Francisco Mime Troupe. He was a member of the acting company of the American Conservatory Theater for six seasons. He acted at the Berkeley Repertory Theatre, at the Huntington Theater of Boston, with the East West Players and the Lodestone Theatre Ensemble.

In 2019, Yee stars in the movie Samir with Ethan Rains, Sprague Grayden, Michelle Lukes, and Peter Greene.

Filmography
A Great Wall (1986) - Paul Fang
So I Married an Axe Murderer (1993) - Master Cho
Copycat (1995) - Chinese Inspector
  Chalk (1996)
Patch Adams (1998) - Orderly
Dumbarton Bridge (1999) - Tron
Life Tastes Good (1999) - Max
True Crime (1999) - Zachary Platt
Nash Bridges (1996–2001) - Dr. Fong / Gene Kwon / Gordon Chang
Sweet November (2001) - Burly Man
Cherish (2002) - Officer Yee
Hawaii (2004) - Detective Scott Chen
Sucker Free City (2004) - Henchman
The Bold and the Beautiful (2004) - Dr. Ying
24 (2005) - Craig Erwich
The Island (2005) - Censor
The Young and the Restless (2005) - Dr. Jun
Curb Your Enthusiasm (2005) - Newscaster
E-Ring (2006) - Admiral Chen
Lucky You (2007) - Chico Bahn
Chuck (2007) - Rashan Chan
Days of Our Lives (2008) - Doctor
The Mentalist (2008) (Pilot) - Davis
Raising the Bar (2008) - Judge Anthony Hu
Entourage (2008) - Taxi Driver
Milk - Gordon Lau
Prison Break (2008) - Company Surgeon / Doctor
Golden Boy (2009) - Mitch
Crash (2008–2009) - Chun Soo Park
Lie to Me (2009) - Ambassador Park Jung-Soo
Eastwick (2009) - Doctor
Accidentally on Purpose (2009) - Dad
Criminal Minds (2010) - Detective Ekler
Silver Case (2011) - Business Man
Hawaii Five-0 (2011) - Chief of Police Mahaka
Bucky Larson: Born to Be a Star (2011) - Vietnamese Mob Boss
Quantum Cops (2011) - The Chief
Wedding Palace (2011) - Wheeler Dealer Uncle
Answers to Nothing (2011)
Chinatown Squad (2012) - Uncle Wong
Keye Luke (2012) - Lee Luke
Fail/Safe (2014) - Kingpin
The Jade Trader (2014) - Shin Shaw
Chicago P.D. - Dennis Lee (episode "The Three Gs" (2015))
Silver Case: Director's Cut (2015) - Business Man #1
Gunz: The Story of Billy the Kidd (2015) - Keegan Oryee
Dead End (2015) - Mr. Lee
I Won't Miss You (2015) - Tim's Dad
Comfort (2016) - Martin
Singularity (2016) - Mr. Lee
S.W.A.T. (2018) - Jae Kim
GLOW (2018) - Mr. Wu
Faith Under Fire (2018) - Harlon Moline
Samir (2019) - Frank
Destroyer (2019) - Lieutenant Oshima
9-1-1 (2019) - John Lee
Grey's Anatomy (TV series) (2019) - Dr. James Lou
Blue Bloods (TV series) (2019) - Mr. Chen
All Rise (TV series) (2019) - Jusdge Randall Roberts
FBI: Most Wanted (2020) - Mr. Woo
The Unicorn (TV series) (2021) - Dr. Wilson
Bosch (TV series) (2021) - Assistant Chief of Police Lester Sales

References

External links
Kelvin Han Yee's Official Page

1961 births
Living people
American male film actors
American male television actors
American people of Chinese descent
Male actors from San Francisco